The Nikon D850 is a professional-grade full-frame digital single-lens reflex camera (DSLR) produced by Nikon. The camera was officially announced on July 25, 2017 (the 100th anniversary of Nikon's founding), launched on August 24, 2017, and first shipped on September 8, 2017. Nikon announced it could not fill the preorders on August 28, 2017 and filled less than 10% of preorders on the first shipping day. It is the successor to the Nikon D810.

The D850 is the first Nikon DSLR featuring a back-illuminated image sensor claiming overall a one-stop image quality (image noise) improvement. This camera was the first full frame DSLR achieving 100 points at Dxomark. The D850 also won Camera of the Year for 2017 at Imaging Resource.

Features 

 Nikon FX format 45.7 megapixel back-illuminated (BSI) CM sensor
 4K UHD video in 30p, 25p, and 24p uncropped in MOV or MP4 encoding and simultaneously uncompressed (HDMI 2.0). New focus peaking aid.
 Slow motion video with up to 120 frames-per-second (fps) in 1080p
 Electronic image stabilization (vibration reduction, VR) in 1080p DX format video. This has shown a strong effect in practice.
 New viewfinder with 100% frame coverage and 0.75× magnification
 Nikon EXPEED5 image processor
 Active D-Lighting (five levels) for the first time also in video
 180K pixel RGB metering system.
Highlight-weighted metering preventing blown highlights or underexposed shadows. Additionally Highlight Display with Zebra Stripes and full aperture metering during live view and video
 Multi-CAM 20K autofocus module with TTL phase detection and fine-tuning, and 153 focus points (including 99 cross-type sensors and 15 sensors that support 8), of which 55 (35 cross-type sensors and 9 8) sensors) are available for selection. Autofocus sensor joystick selector.
 Focus-shift mode (stacking) with special macro mode to shoot a sequence of up to 300 frames
 Live view mode with new Pinpoint autofocus
 Silent Photography mode in live view with up to 6 fps
 8K resolution or 4k Ultra HD silent timelapse video / intervalometer controlled mode up to 9999 frames
 Built-in image sensor cleaning
 7 fps continuous shooting for up to 51 raw images (14-bit lossless raw). Buffer jumps to 170 shots in 12-bit lossless raw. Can shoot 9 frames/s with optional battery grip and larger EN-EL18 battery.
 3.2 inch 2.359-million dot tilting LCD touchscreen
 ISO 64–25600, selectable in  0.3, 0.5, 0.7, 1, or 2-stop increments. ISO expansion increases the range to 32–102400. 
 Retouch Menu: D-Lighting, Distortion Control, Filter Effects, Image Overlay, Monochrome, NEF (raw), Processing, Perspective Control, Red-Eye Correction, Resize, Side-by-Side Comparison, Straighten, Trim, Trim Movie
 Selectable in-camera ISO noise reduction applied in post-processing
 New fast batch processing of many NEF (raw) images
 No Built-in flash, but an optional wireless radio flash control (like the Nikon D5 and Nikon D500) allows control of compatible external flashes.
 Film negative scanner with optional ES-2 Film Digitizing Adapter
 File formats include JPEG, TIFF, NEF (Nikon's raw image format compressed and lossless compressed), and JPEG+NEF (JPEG size/quality selectable)
 Dual memory card slot - XQD slot and SD / SDHC/ SDXC. SD slot is UHS-II compliant
 Wi-Fi and Bluetooth Low Energy
 Button illumination
 Magnesium alloy body with weather sealing
 No optical low-pass filter

With the camera's initial firmware version Wi-Fi only works with Nikon's proprietary "SnapBridge" app, this also applies to other Nikon models. Since a firmware updated in May 2019 Wi-Fi was opened to third party applications.

Reception 

The D850 was awarded best Professional DSLR camera at the 2018 TIPA World Awards.

The D850 is also the first DSLR camera to achieve 100 points on the DxOMark sensor review.

The Verge and Fstoppers have compared the Nikon D850 favourably to the Canon 5D Mark IV. A wildlife photography needs (autofocus, noise, speed) review favours the D850 compared to other Nikons with special regard to the new viewfinder.

Comparisons with the Nikon D810 or Nikon D800E show significant image noise improvement.

Nikon D850 produced better image quality than the Canon 5D Mark IV.

The D850 won  Readers Award and Editors Award in 2018.

References

External links

 Nikon D850 Brochure Nikon
 Nikon D850 | D810 Comparison Guide Nikon
 Nikon D850 Manual Nikon

D850
D850
Live-preview digital cameras
Cameras introduced in 2017
Full-frame DSLR cameras